This is a list of the moths of family Lasiocampidae which are found in Chile. It also acts as an index to the species articles and forms part of the full List of moths of Chile. 

Euglyphis lignosa (Walker, 1855)
Macromphalia affinis (Feisthamel, 1839)
Macromphalia ancilla (Philippi, 1859)
Macromphalia dedecora (Feisthamel, 1839)
Macromphalia felispardalis Ureta, 1957
Macromphalia hypoleuca (Philippi, 1859)
Macromphalia nigrofasciata Ureta, 1957
Macromphalia nitida Butler, 1882
Macromphalia oehrensi Ureta, 1957
Macromphalia purissima Butler, 1882
Macromphalia rivularis Butler, 1882
Macromphalia rubiginea rubiginea Ureta, 1957
Macromphalia rubiginea rufa Ureta, 1957
Macromphalia spadix Draudt, 1927

External links
Macrolepidópteros Heteróceros de Chile y de sus áreas adyacentes

.L
Chile
Moths, Lasiocampidae